John Jardine may refer to:

John Jardine (American football) (1936–1990), American football coach
John Jardine (British Columbia politician) (1857–1937), politician in British Columbia, Canada
Sir John Jardine, 1st Baronet (1844–1919), Scottish businessman and Liberal politician
Sir John Jardine, 3rd Baronet (1683–1737)
John Jardine (Prince Edward Island politician), Prince Edward Island, Canada politician
John Jardine, police magistrate at Rockhampton, Government Resident in the Torres Strait Islands from 1862. 
 Rick Jardine (John Frederick Jardine), Canadian mathematician
John Jardine (minister) (1716-1766) Dean of the Chapel Royal in Scotland

See also
Jardine baronets for others